is a Japanese professional baseball Infielder for the Fukuoka SoftBank Hawks of Nippon Professional Baseball（NPB).

Professional career
On October 26, 2020, Kawarada was drafted by the Fukuoka Softbank Hawks in the 2020 Nippon Professional Baseball draft. 

In 2021 season, he played in the Western League of NPB's second league, and also played in the informal matches against the Shikoku Island League Plus's teams and amateur baseball teams.

On July 5, 2022, Kawarada made his First League debut in the Pacific League against the Tohoku Rakuten Golden Eagles.

References

External links

 Career statistics - NPB.jp
 46 Jumpei Kawarada PLAYERS2022 - Fukuoka SoftBank Hawks Official site

2002 births
Living people
Fukuoka SoftBank Hawks players
Japanese baseball players
Nippon Professional Baseball infielders
Baseball people from Iwate Prefecture